Philip Eliot, Elliot, or Elliott may refer to:

 Philip Eliot (priest) (1835–1917), Anglican Dean of Windsor
 Philip Eliot (bishop) (1862–1946), Bishop of Buckingham, son of the dean
 Jim Elliot (Philip James Elliot, 1927–1956), evangelical Christian missionary
 Phil Elliott (born 1960), British comic book creator
 Father Philip Elliott, fictional character in Against the Wind (1948 film)